Christopher Aldane Nickels Cameron (22 May 1894 – 15 August 1966) was an Australian rules footballer who played with Carlton in the Victorian Football League (VFL).

Notes

External links 

		
Chris Cameron's profile at Blueseum

1894 births
Australian rules footballers from Victoria (Australia)
Carlton Football Club players
Australian military personnel of World War I
1966 deaths
Military personnel from Victoria (Australia)